Mario Joseph Palumbo (April 13, 1933 – July 4, 2004) was a Democratic politician from Kanawha County, West Virginia.

Early life and education
Palumbo was the son of the late Jack and Nancy Palumbo.

He graduated cum laude from Morris Harvey College in 1954, where he was student body president and recipient of the Liston Award for excellence in scholarship, character and athleticism, which was awarded to him during the NAIA Basketball Tournament. In 1957, he graduated from the West Virginia University College of Law.

Career
In 1958, he joined the law firm of Woodroe, Kizer & Steed (now Kay, Casto & Chaney PPL).

Palumbo served as a legal officer with the West Virginia Air National Guard and retired in 1981 with the rank of lieutenant colonel.

He was elected to the West Virginia Senate in 1968 and served five consecutive terms, being re-elected in 1972, 1976, 1980 and 1984. During his tenure in the Senate, he served as chairman of the Committee on Education from 1971 to 1972 and as chairman of the Committee on the Judiciary from 1973 to 1980.

In 1990, Palumbo was elected attorney general to complete the unexpired term of his predecessor, Charlie Brown. In 1992, he ran for governor of West Virginia, running third in the Democratic Primary, behind then-Governor Gaston Caperton and then-State Senator Charlotte Pritt.

Later life and death
Palumbo died on July 4, 2004, just one day after the death of his wife.

Family
Mario was married to his wife, Louise, with whom he had two sons, Mario (Chris) and Corey Palumbo, a former member of the West Virginia State Senate.

References

External links

 

1933 births
2004 deaths
West Virginia Attorneys General
United States Air Force officers
West Virginia University College of Law alumni
People from Kanawha County, West Virginia
Charleston Golden Eagles men's basketball players
Democratic Party West Virginia state senators
Military personnel from West Virginia
West Virginia National Guard personnel
20th-century American politicians
American men's basketball players
Morris Harvey College alumni